Bufalini is an Italian surname. Notable people with the surname include:

Francesco Antonio Bufalini, Italian draftsman, copper plate engraver and architect
Giovanni Ottavio Bufalini (1709–1782), Italian cardinal
Maurizio Bufalini (1787–1875), Italian physician
Sauro Bufalini (1941–2012), Italian basketball player
Ventura Bufalini (died 1504), Italian Roman Catholic prelate, Bishop of Terni and Città di Castello

Italian-language surnames